Glycomyces algeriensis is a bacterium from the genus of Glycomyces which has been isolated from soil from a potato field in Algeria.

References 

Actinomycetia
Bacteria described in 2004